Party Warriors is an album by Captain Jack. it was released in 2003.

Track listing
 "Heyaaah (Intro)" -  1:02
 "Centerfold (Radio Mix)" - 2:56
 "Give it Up (Radio Mix)" - 3:26 
 "Iko Iko (140 BPM Trance Remix)" - 3:37 
 "Early in the Morning (We like the Captain)" - 2:51
 "Stand Up ('til We Get Enough)" - 3:09 
 "Hai Hai Hai (Thanx Japan and Fuyuki)" - 3:32 
 "Party Warriors (Our fight is Glorious)" - 3:28
 "Don't you Just Know it (Don't Ha Ha)" - 2:41 
 "Hush (Na-Na, Na-Na)" - 3:06 
 "Turn it Up 2002 (The Power Mix)" - 3:16
 "Go West (Fast Mellow Mix)" - 3:33 
 "Take Me Out To The BallGame (Captain's Drill Remix)" - 3:13  
 "Dancing Pompokolin (Captain's Eurasia Mix)" - 3:40 
 "Centerfold (130 BPM Move it Remix)" - 3:24
 "Centerfold (Trance Remix Clubversion) feat. DJ Perplexter" - 6:45
 "Ahuga (Outro)" - 1:15

References

2002 albums
Captain Jack (band) albums